Federico Krutwig Sagredo (Getxo, 15 May 1921 – Bilbao, 15 November 1998) was a Spanish Basque writer, philosopher, politician, and author of several books, with Vasconia standing out in the political domain for its influence in the early stages of ETA, and as an advocate of classic Labourdin for the standardization of Basque. He distanced from Sabino Arana's brand of Basque nationalism, emphasizing language instead of race as pivotal for the Basque nation.

Along with Felix Likiniano, he tried to create some resistance to Franco's dictatorial regime after the Spanish Civil War. The thought of both authors, melding Basque nationalism and anarchism gave birth to a minor political current known as Anarkoabertzalism (Anarcho-independentism), which eventually merged within the hybrid of Marxism and Anarchism known as Autonomism.

Biography
Federico Krutwig was born on 15 May 1921 in Getxo, the son of a bourgeois family of German origin. He taught himself the Basque language. He joined the Basque-Language Academy in 1943, where he favoured the standardisation of Basque around the Labourdine dialect of the first printed books in Basque, and with an etymological orthography. However, the Academy preferred the Guipuscoan dialect as the basis of Standard Basque. Krutwig's Basque language standardisation proposal was not to be applied beyond the members of the Jakintza Baitha ("House of Knowledge") Hellenophile society.

In 1952, after rejecting  joining the Basque-Language Academy, and after his criticisms of the position of the Catholic Church in reference to the Basque language, he went into exile in France. Once in Donibane-Lohizune he contacted members of the movement . In 1963 he edited the book , in which he questioned part of the traditional Basque nationalism of Sabino Arana and proposed a new Basque nationalism.

Krutwig collaborated with ex-militants of EGI and theorized about the use of violence for political purposes. In 1964 he was expelled from France and moved to Brussels, Belgium. Here he made contact with members of ETA. He elaborated some memoranda for ETA's V at Guethary, and put ETA in contact with the Czech weapon industry. In 1975 he abandoned ETA and established his residency back in Spain in Zarauz, to dedicate himself exclusively to literary production.

His main writings are:
 (1963): Published initially under the pseudonym of Fernando Sarrailh de Ihartza, in which Krutwig describes an ideal Greater Basqueland comprising all the supposedly historical territories, from the Garonne to the Ebro rivers.
  (The New Europe, 1976): In this essay Krutwig extends his ideas on Greater Vasconia to Western Europe, claiming and hoping for an "internal decolonization" of the continent and proposing what could be grossly taken as the Europe of the Regions.
  (Garaldea: On the origin of Basques and their relation to Guanches, 1978): In this, maybe his most scientific and serious essay, Krutwig studies the origins of the Basques and explores a hypothetical  (land of "we are" or land of the flame), extending at some time in the past through all Western Europe and the Mediterranean basin. In the annexes, he analyzes transcriptions of Guanche (native Canarian) and Pictish inscriptions, concluding that their two extinct languages are not just related to Basque but that they are the very same tongue. This daring claim has not been corroborated by anyone so far, and nearly all specialists in the subject consider it erroneous.
 (1984)

He spoke and read several ancient and modern languages. He translated works of Goethe and Mao Zedong into Basque. Krutwig died in Bilbao in 1998.

Influence
The Basque folk group  released an album  featuring collaborations with Canarian musicians.

References
Apuntes sobre la vida de Federico Krutwig Sagredo by Maria Agirre
Computer Shock·a Euskari.a +2001. Urthea, Basque translation of Krutwig's "Computer Shock Vasconia Año 2001" by Arima −23/11/14 43°19′17′′N 1°59′8′′W

Sources
 Sudupe, Pako 2011: 50eko hamarkadako euskal literatura I. Hizkuntza eta ideologia eztabaidak, Donostia, Utriusque Vasconiae. 
 Sudupe, Pako 2011: 50eko hamarkadako euskal literatura II. Kazetaritza eta saiakera, Donostia, Utriusque Vasconiae. 
 Sudupe, Pako 2012: "Ideologia eztabaidak 50eko hamarkadan" in Alaitz Aizpuru (koord.), Euskal Herriko pentsamenduaren gida, Bilbo, UEU.

External links

Comprehensive bibliography of Federico Krutwig

1921 births
1998 deaths
People from Getxo
Spanish people of German descent
Basque writers
Spanish male writers
Basque-language writers
Spanish anarchists
Spanish revolutionaries
ETA (separatist group) activists
Male essayists
Spanish essayists
20th-century essayists